The Altyn Mosque is a mosque in Yarkand in Yarkant County, Xinjiang, China. It is noted for its painted ceilings and the tomb of the poet Amannisa Khan (1526-60) which is in its courtyard. She was the wife of one of the local Khans. 

Beyond the mosque is a cemetery housing the tombs of the Khans of Yarkand.

See also
 Islam in China
 List of mosques in China

References

Major National Historical and Cultural Sites in Xinjiang
Mosques in Xinjiang